Linda Celida Meade-Tollin (born 16 August 1944) is an American biochemist and cancer researcher. In her research at the University of Arizona, she studied DNA damage, angiogenesis, and cancer invasion & metastasis; directed the Office of Women in Science and Engineering there; and was the first female chairperson of the National Organization for the Professional Advancement of Black Chemists and Chemical Engineers (NOBCChE).

Early life and education
Meade-Tollin was born on August 16, 1944 in London, West Virginia, the daughter of Robert Alfred Meade, a dentist & community activist, and Virginia May Meade, a teacher & guidance counselor. She grew up in London and did well in school, skipping two grades and entering high school at a young age. Her first year of high school was also the school's first year of racial integration, and the first opportunity Meade-Tollin and her female peers to enroll in a science course.

At the age of 16, Meade-Tollin entered West Virginia State College. She studied chemistry, was a member of Alpha Kappa Alpha, and completed her Bachelor of Science in 1964 at age 19.

She continued to Hunter College where she completed a Master of Science in biochemistry in 1969. Meade-Tollin worked at both Harlem and Bellevue Hospitals before entering a Ph.D. program in chemistry at the City University of New York (CUNY) at age 21. After a year, she switched to biochemistry, completing her thesis on gene expression in E. coli and finishing her degree in 1972. Meade-Tollin may have been first Black woman to graduate from CUNY with a biochem Ph.D. but CUNY records don't indicate race and therefore cannot confirm this milestone.

Career
Meade-Tollin accepted a faculty appointment at the College at Old Westbury, simultaneously serving as a visiting assistant professor at Rockefeller University, where she studied sickle cell anemia as part of Anthony Cerami's research team.

In 1975, she began a National Institutes of Health biochemistry research fellowship at the University of Arizona in Tucson. At the time, she was the only Black woman to head a biomedical research laboratory there, and her research focused on studying DNA damage, angiogenesis, and cancer invasion & metastasis.

Her angiogenesis research first used human microvascular endothelial cells to develop "a more physiologically relevant and highly reproducible rapid model angiogenesis assay", which researchers then used to screen desert plants and fungi for ingredients that could be used in cancer treatment drugs. Meade-Tollin worked with Leslie Gunatilaka & Luke Whitesell on this research.

At the University of Arizona, Meade-Tollin was the director of the Office of Women in Science and Engineering in the Department of Women's Studies, and she spent significant time planning and developing workshops and conferences that sought to encourage women to enter science and engineering fields. She also helped present American Association of Medical Colleges workshops for leaders in medical academia.

Meade-Tollin spent a year as faculty development fellow at the Morehouse School of Medicine in Atlanta and in 1993 became the first female national chairperson of the National Organization for the Professional Advancement of Black Chemists and Chemical Engineers (NOBCChE).

She retired from the University of Arizona as a Research Assistant Professor Emerita in 2008.

Awards and honors
1987 & 1988 Minority Investigator award, National Cancer Institute
1994 Minority Investigator award, National Heart Lung and Blood Institute
1998 award from NOBCChE for contributions "to the field of biochemistry and medical research"
Board member, international journal Acta Histochemica

Personal life
While at Rockefeller University, Meade-Tollin met Gordon Tollin who was on sabbatical there.

During her tenure at the University of Arizona, Meade-Tollin was a caregiver for her aging parents. As of 2012, Meade-Tollin, who had divorced her husband, lived in Tucson.

Selected publications

References

City University of New York alumni
State University of New York at Old Westbury
Rockefeller University
University of Arizona
Morehouse School of Medicine
American women physicians
Physicians from West Virginia
Scientists from West Virginia
American women chemists
African-American women scientists
Women biochemists
African-American chemists
20th-century American biochemists
20th-century American physicians
20th-century American women writers
21st-century American biochemists
21st-century American physicians
21st-century American women writers
1944 births
Living people